The Sari Fisk Award is an ice hockey trophy awarded by the Finnish Ice Hockey Association to the player with the best plus–minus at the end of the regular season of the Naisten Liiga.

It is named after Sari Marjamäki , who began her career in the Naisten SM-sarja at age 13 and went on to play 23 seasons in the league. As a member of the Finnish national team, Marjamäki played in the women’s ice hockey tournaments at three Winter Olympic Games, eight IIHF Women's World Championships, and five IIHF European Women Championships. She won bronze at the 1998 Winter Olympics and recorded the highest plus–minus of all the players in the tournament, in addition to winning six World Championship bronze medals and five European Championship medals, four gold and one bronze. Fisk was inducted into the Hockey Hall of Fame Finland as Suomen Jääkiekkoleijona #223 in 2014, the fourth woman to ever receive the honour. 

The trophy was named after Marjamäki for the 2010–11 season and was first awarded to Riikka Noronen of HPK Kiekkonaiset. The most Sari Fisk Awards won by a player is two, a record held by both Noronen and Saija Tarkki. Tarkki is the only player to win the trophy consecutively, claiming it in the 2017–18 and 2018–19 seasons. The title is currently held by Kiira Yrjänen of Kiekko-Espoo, winner in the 2021–22 season.

Award winners 

Source: Elite Prospects

All time award recipients

References

Naisten Liiga (ice hockey) trophies and awards